Annabelle Lopez Ochoa (born 30 April 1973) is a Belgian-born international choreographer based out of Amsterdam, Netherlands.

Dance background
Ochoa, who is half-Colombian and half-Belgian, completed her dance training at the Royal Ballet Academy in Antwerp, Belgium. She appeared with various German companies before eventually joining Djazzex, a contemporary dance company, in 1993. In 1997, she joined Scapino Ballet Rotterdam, where she was a soloist for seven years.
.

Choreographic style
Overall, Ochoa's work relates emotional experience through an abstract but intently connected style of choreography, which occasionally relies on virtuosic technique. Her movement is contemporary, however, she occasionally displays classical virtuosity, such as a soaring grand jeté. Because she uses the abstract form, her works do not have established plot lines or characters. She does, however, want the dancers to "tell a story" within the work. She achieves this by emphasizing the eyes, using them as a connecting point among the dancers on stage as well as with the audience. To organize her movement, she is interested in "constructed chaos", a carefully structured work that appears to lack structure. This method makes her creations insightfully detailed while remaining well organized. Ochoa enjoys working with a wide range of dancers, and also enjoys working with actors. She finds inspiration primarily from art and music, not from the dancers or from other choreographers.

Before After
Ochoa's first critically acclaimed work in the United States is Before After, a seven-minute duet which "delineates the last moments of a relationship". The New York Times described the number as short and simple, but also "the most moving, the most mysterious, the most heartily cheered. Clive Barnes raved that it was the "best in the…shows". Not every reviewer shared this enthusiasm, however; Laura Bleiberg suggested that the piece was not unique in its themes or structure, and that "Ochoa added few insights". Before After is at this date on the repertoire of Dutch National Ballet, Finnish National Ballet, Gothenborg Ballet, Ballet Hispanico, Whim Whim, and Pacific Northwest Ballet.

Awards
Ochoa won the International Choreographic Competition Hannover in 2001 with her work "Clair/Obscur". She also won first prize at the Bornem International Competition in 2002 with "Replay". In the fall of 2007, she participated in the New York Choreographic Institute, working for two weeks with the New York City Ballet.
In January 2013, Annabelle Lopez Ochoa was awarded with the 'Best Classical Choreography' award by the Circle of Critics of the National Dance Award UK for the production "A streetcar named desire", her first full-length ballet which she choreographed for the Scottish Ballet. In that same year the production received the South-Bank Awards 2012 and was nominated for an Olivier Award.
In January 2015, her work "Sombrerisismo", created for Ballet Hispanico and one of the three commissions by Fall for Dance NYC 2014, is awarded with the Villanueva award in Cuba.

List of works
Annabelle Lopez Ochoa has choreographed works for the Scapino Ballet Rotterdam, Dutch National Ballet, Djazzex, The Royal Ballet of Flanders, Ballet du Grand Theatre du Genève, Ankara Modern Dance Theater, BalletX, Pennsylvania Ballet, Luna Negra Dance Theater, Istanbul Modern Dance Theater, BJM-Danse Montreal, Le Jeune Ballet du Quebec, Gothenborg Ballet, Pennsylvania Ballet, Ballet National de Marseille, Ballet Hispanico, Jacoby & Pronk, Saarbrücken Ballett, Chemnitzer Ballett, Whim W'him, Incolballet, Pacific Northwest Ballet, Finnish National Ballet, Compania Nacional de Danza, Scottish Ballet, Atlanta Ballet, Ballet Austin, The Washington Ballet, Grand Rapids Ballet, Ballet Augsburg, Ballet Nacional Dominicano, Incolballet de Cali, Ballet Nacional de Cuba, Ballet Moscow, West Australian Ballet, Ballet Manila, Joffrey Ballet of Chicago, Ballet Nacional de Chile and Danza Contemporanea de Cuba.

She created two ballets based on the life of Mexican painter Frida Kahlo, Broken Wings and Frida.

References

External links
Official Annabelle Lopez Ochoa website.
Lopez Ochoa's blog.
opez Ochoa's YouTube channel.

1973 births
Living people
Dancers of The Royal Ballet
Belgian choreographers